The Changhua County Government (CHCG) is the local government of Changhua County, Taiwan.

Organization
 Magistrate
 Deputy Magistrate
 Secretary-general

First Class Department
 Department of Civil Affairs
 Department of Finance
 Department of Economic Affairs
 Department of Education
 Department of Public Works
 Department of Water Resources
 Department of City and Tourism Development
 Department of Agriculture
 Department of Social Affairs
 Department of Labor Affairs
 Department of Land Administration
 Department of Information
 Department of General Affairs
 Department of Planning
 Department of Legal Affairs
 Consumer Ombudsman officer
 Department of Personnel
 Department of Accounting and Statistics
 Department of Civil Service Ethics

First-Class Organ
 Police Bureau
 Public Health Bureau
 Fire Bureau
 Environmental Protection Bureau
 Local Tax Bureau
 Cultural Affairs Bureau

Second-class Organ
 Household Registration Office
 Land Office
 Public Health Center
 Chronic Disease Center
 Animal Disease Center
 Family Education Center

School
 Six-year High School
 Junior High School
 Elementary School

Senior Consumer Ombudsman

Access
The county hall is accessible within walking distance south east from Changhua Station of Taiwan Railways.

See also
 Changhua County Council

References

External links

 

Changhua County
Local governments of the Republic of China